Lisa Ida Marie Johansson (born 11 April 1992) is a Swedish ice hockey player and member of the Swedish national team, currently playing in the Swedish Women's Hockey League (SDHL) with Luleå HF/MSSK. A two-time Olympian, she represented Sweden in the women's ice hockey tournament at the 2018 Winter Olympics in PyeongChang and in the women's ice hockey tournament at the 2022 Winter Olympics in Beijing. She also participated in the IIHF Women's World Championship tournaments in 2013, 2016, 2017, and 2019.

Johansson was named SDHL Player of the Year for the 2016–17 season by the Swedish Ice Hockey Association.

References

External links
 
 

1992 births
Living people
AIK Hockey Dam players
Ice hockey players at the 2018 Winter Olympics
Ice hockey players at the 2022 Winter Olympics
Leksands IF Dam players
Luleå HF/MSSK players
Olympic ice hockey players of Sweden
People from Nybro Municipality
Sportspeople from Kalmar County
Swedish women's ice hockey forwards